The following is a list of automobiles (including pickup trucks, SUVs, and vans) made with diesel engines.

Alfa Romeo
Former
 145
 146
 147
 155
 156
 159
 164
 166
 33
 75
 90
 Alfa 6
 Alfetta
 Brera
 GT

Current
 Giulia
 Stelvio
 MiTo
 Giulietta

Audi
Former
 80
 90
 100
 4000
 5000
 Allroad
 A2

Current
 A1
 A3
 A4
 A5
 A6
 A7
 A8
 Q2
 Q3
 Q5
 Q7
 Q8

Buick
Former
 Century
 Electra
 LeSabre
 Riviera

Current
 Regal

BMW
 1 Series
 2 Series

 3 Series
 4 Series

 5 Series

 6 Series

 7 Series
 8 Series (G15)

 X1
 X2
 X3
 X4
 X5
 X6

Cadillac
 BLS 1.9D

Chevrolet
 Blazer
 C10 Pickup
 C1500
 C20 Pickup
 C2500
 C30 Pickup
 C3500
 Caprice
 Celebrity
 Chevette
Colorado 
 El Camino
 E Series (2006)
 G20 Van
 G2500 Van
 G30 Van
 G3500 Van
 Impala
 K10 Pickup
 K1500
 K20 Pickup
 K2500
 K30 Pickup
 K3500
 Kodiak (2005)
 Luv
 Malibu
 Monte Carlo
 P20 Van
 P30 Van
 R10 Pickup
 R20 Pickup
 R2500
 R30 Pickup
 R3500
 Silverado (2006)
 Suburban
 Tahoe
 V10 Pickup
 V30 Pickup
 V3500 Pickup

Chrysler
Former
 Chrysler 300M

Current
 Chrysler 300C

Citroën
Former
 AX
 BX
 CX
 Evasion
 Saxo
 Visa
 Xantia
 XM
 Xsara
 ZX
Current
 Berlingo
 C1
 C2
 C3
 C4
 C5
 C6
 C8
 Jumpy
 Jumper
 Xsara Picasso

Covini 
 Covini T44
 Covini T46
 Covini T40
 Covini B24 Turbo
 Covini C36

Smart
Former
 Smart Roadster

Current
 Smart Fortwo
 Smart Forfour

Dacia
 Papucs
 Solenza
 Duster
 Logan
 Sandero

Dodge
 Ram 2500 HD
 Ram 3500 HD
 Ram 4500 HD
 Sprinter
 Ram 50

Fiat
Former
 131
 132
 Argenta
 Bravo/Brava
 Duna/Prêmio
 Elba
 Regata
 Strada
 Fiat Tempra
 Tipo
Current
 Albea
 Croma
 Doblò
 Ducato
 Fiorino
 Idea
 Marea
 Multipla
 Palio
 Panda
 Punto
 Palio Weekend
 Scudo
 Sedici
 Siena
 Stilo
 Strada
 Ulysse
 Uno

Ford Motor Company
 Bronco (1983–1996)
 E-Series
 Escort (1984–1987)
 Excursion
 F-Series (1983–1997)
 Fiesta
 Fusion
 Galaxy
 Lion VLE
 Mondeo
 Focus
 Focus C-MAX
 Ranger
 S-MAX (2006–)
 Super Duty
 Tempo (1984–1986)
 Tourneo
Figo
Figo Aspire
Endeavour

International
 Scout II (1980)

GMC
 Savana (2006)
 Sierra (2005)
 Topkick (2005)

Holden
 Gemini

Honda
 CR-V
 Civic

Hummer
 Hummer H1

Hyundai
Former
 Entourage
 Terracan
 Trajet
Current
 Accent
 Elantra
 Getz
 H-1/Starex
 i30
 Matrix
 Santa Fe
 Tucson
 Veracruz

Infiniti
 EX
 FX
 M

Isuzu
 Faster

Jaguar
Former
 X-Type
 S-Type (1999)

Current
 XE
 XF
 XJ
 E-Pace
 F-Pace

Jeep
Former

Liberty (2005–2006)

Current
 Cherokee
 Grand Cherokee
 Wrangler
 Gladiator

Kia
 Carens
 Carnival
 cee'd
 Mohave
 Sorento
 Soul
 Sportage
 Venga

Lancia
Former
 Dedra
 Delta
 Kappa
 Prisma
 Thema
 Zeta
Current
 Lybra
 Musa
 Phedra
 Thesis
 Ypsilon

Land Rover
Current
 Defender
 Freelander TD4
 Discovery TDV6
 Range Rover Sport TDV6
 Range Rover TDV8

Lexus
 IS 220d
 LX 450d

Lincoln
 Continental Mark VII

Maserati
 Ghibli (M157)
 Quattroporte (M156)
 Levante

Mahindra
Scorpio
XUV500
KUV100
Xylo
Bolero
TUV300
Quanto
Nuvosport
Thar
XUV300

Mazda
 Mazda2
 Mazda3
 Mazda6
 CX-3
 CX-5
 CX-8
 BT-50

Mercedes-Benz
Former
 W110
 W120
 W123
 W124
 W201
 W136
 W126
 CLC-Class
 CLK-Class
 R-Class
 Vario

Current
 A-Class
 B-Class
 C-Class
 E-Class
 S-Class
 CLA-Class
 CLS-Class
 GLA-Class
 GLC-Class
 GLE-Class
 GLS-Class
 G-Class
 SLK-Class
 X-Class
 Citan
 Vito
 Sprinter

Mercury
 Lynx
 Topaz

Mini
Former
 Coupé/Roadster
 Paceman

Current
 Hatch
 Clubman
 Countryman

Mitsubishi
 Lancer
 L200
 Libero
 Pajero
 Delica
 Adventure

Nissan
 Almera
 Primera
 Terrano
 X-Trail
 Sentra
 Maxima
 Patrol
 Pathfinder
 Caravan
 720
 Navara
 Titan

Opel
Former
 Ascona
 Blitz
 Frontera
 Kadett
 Omega
 Rekord
 Senator
 Signum
 Sintra
 Vectra
Current
 Agila
 Antara
 Astra
 Cascada
 Combo
 Corsa
 Insignia
 Meriva
 Mokka
 Movano A/B
 Movano C
 Vivaro
 Zafira Tourer

Peugeot
Former
 106
 204
 205
 304
 305
 306
 309
 404
 405
 406
 504
 505
 604
 605
 806
Current
 107
 206
 207
 307
 407
 607
 807
 1007
 Boxer
 Partner

Renault
Former
 9
 11
 18
 19
 20/30
 25
 Fuego
 Safrane
Current
 Clio
 Espace
 Kangoo
 Laguna
 Mégane
 Modus
 Scénic
 Vel Statis

Rover
Former
 100
 200
 25
 400
 45
 620
 75
 800
 Metro
 SD1
 Maestro
 Montego

Saab Automobile
Former
 9-3
 9-5

SEAT
Former
 Arosa
 Inca
 Málaga/Gredos
Current
 Alhambra
 Altea / Altea XL / Freetrack
 Córdoba
 Exeo
 Ibiza / Ibiza SC / Ibiza ST
 León
 Toledo

Škoda
Former
 Felicia
Current
 Fabia
 Octavia
 Superb

Suzuki
Former
 Vitara/Sidekick/Escudo
 Esteem/Baleno
Current
 Aerio/Liana
 Grand Vitara
 Ignis
 Jimny
 Swift
 SX4
 Wagon R
 XL-7
 Vitara Brezza
 Dzire
 Ertiga

Talbot
Former
 Horizon
 Tagora

Tata Group
 Telcoline
 Sumo
 Safari
 Spacio
 Victa
 Ace
 407
 1512
 Novus
Hexa
Tigor
Tiago

Nexon

Toyota
 Avensis
 Camry
 Corolla
 Chaser
 Hiace
 Hilux
 Land Cruiser
 Land Cruiser Prado
 RAV4
 Yaris
 Caldina
 Avanza
Etios

Vauxhall
 Carlton

Volkswagen
Former
 Phaeton
 CC
 Lupo
 Vanagon

Current
 Beetle
 Polo
 Golf
 Jetta
 Passat
 Arteon
 T-Roc
 Tiguan Limited
 Touareg
 Atlas
 Sharan
 Touran
 Bora
 Caddy
 Fox
 Transporter
Vento
Ameo

Volvo
Former
 240
 260
 440
 460
 740
 760
 940
 960
 S90
 V40
 V90
Current
 C70
 C70
 S40
 S60
 S80
 V50
 V70
 XC60
 XC70
 XC90

Lists of cars